The 2022–23 season is the 55th season in the existence of Trabzonspor, all coming in the top flight of Turkish football. In addition to the domestic league, Trabzonspor is participating in this season's editions of the Turkish Cup, the Turkish Super Cup, the UEFA Champions League, the UEFA Europa League and the UEFA Europa Conference League.

Players

Current squad

Out on loan

Transfers

In

Out

Pre-season and friendlies

Competitions

Overall record

Süper Lig

League table

Results summary

Results by matchday

Matches

Turkish Cup

Turkish Super Cup

UEFA Champions League

Play-off round
The draw for the play-off round was held on 2 August 2022.

UEFA Europa League

Group stage

The draw for the group stage was held on 26 August 2022.

UEFA Europa Conference League

Knockout phase

Knockout round play-offs
The draw for the knockout round play-offs was held on 7 November 2022.

Statistics

Squad statistics

References

Trabzonspor seasons
Trabzonspor
2022–23 UEFA Champions League participants seasons